Little Haven is a  nature reserve in Thundersley in Essex. It is owned by the Little Haven Children's Hospice, and leased to the Essex Wildlife Trust (EWT).

This site has diverse habitats of woodland, meadows, scrub and hedges. The main trees are sessile oaks, hornbeams and sweet chestnut, and plants such as wood sorrel and are indicators of ancient woodland. The reserve is one of only 25 in the courty where the rare heath fritillary is well established. The hedges provide nesting sites for migrating birds such as whitethroats.

There is access to the site by a footpath from St Michael's Road through Tile Wood, a neighbouring EWT nature reserve.

References

Essex Wildlife Trust